Amandine is a Romanian chocolate layered cake filled with chocolate with caramel and fondant cream. Almond cream is sometimes used. As most Romanian cakes, they can be cut and served in 1-serving miniature cakes or as a big cake.

These cakes are among the most traditional "sweetshop" cakes in Romania. The original recipe has layers of chocolate sponge cake soaked in rum flavored caramel syrup. The cream filling is a combination of chocolate buttercream mixed with fondant. The assembled layers are glazed with a combination of fondant with chocolate and rum or rum essence, poured over the cake while still slightly liquid.

These cakes have also a traditional decoration on top with a little bit of the cream and a diamond-shaped piece of thin chocolate.

References 

Romanian pastries
Chocolate desserts
Chocolate-covered foods
Layer cakes
Sponge cakes